Lemko was a weekly ethnic newspaper, published in the United States in Philadelphia by Lemkos for the immigrant population. It was succeeded by Karpatska Rus'.

Defunct weekly newspapers
Lemko American
Defunct newspapers of Philadelphia
Publications established in 1927
Publications disestablished in 1939
Rusyn-American history
Rusyn-language newspapers
Weekly newspapers published in the United States
Rusyn-American culture in Pennsylvania
Rusyn culture